Journey to the Centre of the Eye is the debut album from English progressive rock band Nektar that came out in November 1971. Though formally divided into 13 tracks, the entire album consists of a single continuous piece of music, with some musical themes which are repeated throughout the work. Because of its narrative nature, it has been called a rock opera and/or dense concept album. The story follows an astronaut who, while on a voyage to Saturn, encounters aliens who take him to their galaxy, where he is suffused with knowledge and wisdom. It is usually interpreted as a commentary on the nuclear arms race.

Reception

Allmusic's retrospective review was a rave, avowing that "Throughout Journey's 13 cuts, Nektar introduced their own sort of instrumental surrealism that radiated from both the vocals and from the intermingling of the haphazard drum and string work." They gave unqualified praise to both the compositions and the performances of each of the individual members.

Track listing
All songs written and arranged by Nektar.

2013 reissue
A double CD reissue of Journey to the Centre of the Eye was released in 2013 on Purple Pyramid Records. The first CD is the original album. The second CD two includes part of a live 1971 show from Germany, where the band played the entire title song. (During later tours, exemplified by the 1973 show which appears on the 2021 live album Sounds Like Swiss, Nektar played a heavily abbreviated rendition of the song which ends with the "Dream Nebula" movement.) Additional songs from this "Official Bootleg" show are included on the 2013 reissues of A Tab in the Ocean and ...Sounds Like This.

Personnel
Roye Albrighton - guitars, vocals
Mick Brockett - liquid lights
Allan "Taff" Freeman - Mellotron, pianos, organ, vocals
Ron Howden - drums, percussion
Derek "Mo" Moore - Mellotron, bass, vocals
Keith Walters - static slides

Additional personnel
Dieter Dierks - additional piano

Production
Produced by Nektar, Dieter Dierks & Peter Hauke
Engineered by Dieter Dierks

References

External links
 Journey to the Centre of the Eye at TheNektarProject.com

Nektar albums
1971 debut albums
Rock operas
Concept albums